Westringia grandifolia is a species of plant in the mint family that is endemic to Australia. It occurs in wallum habitats in south-eastern Queensland, and is listed as Endangered under Queensland's Nature Conservation Act 1992.

References

grandifolia
Lamiales of Australia
Flora of Queensland
Taxa named by George Bentham
Plants described in 1870